TVA Nouvelles is the news division of TVA, a French language television network in Canada.  

Programs produced by the division include nightly local and national newscasts branded as TVA Nouvelles, as well as the news magazine program JE. The division also owns and operates the 24-hour news channel Le Canal Nouvelles.

In September 2020, the Group announced that Serge Fortin, who was managing the activities of TVA Nouvelles and LCN since 2004, would be replaced by Martin Picard, vice president and chief content officer.

Mornings
In the mornings, TVA Nouvelles airs as headline news segments during the network's breakfast television program Salut, Bonjour!. These segments are anchored by Gino Chouinard weekdays from Montreal, and Ève-Marie Lortie on weekends from Quebec City.

Noon
At noon, TVA Nouvelles airs for one hour weekdays and half an hour on weekends. Two weekday editions are produced, with Pierre Bruneau anchoring from Montreal for stations in western Quebec markets (Gatineau/Ottawa, Sherbrooke, Trois-Rivières and Rouyn-Noranda), and Pierre Jobin anchoring from Quebec City for stations in eastern Quebec (Rimouski, Rivière-du-Loup/Carleton-sur-Mer and Saguenay). Both programs also have segments set aside for local inserts presented by local anchors.

As most viewers in Canada outside of Quebec receive TVA stations from Montreal or Gatineau/Ottawa, the edition anchored by Bruneau is seen in most of Canada, although parts of New Brunswick receive the Jobin edition.

Afternoon
At 5 p.m. weekdays, TVA Nouvelles airs for 1.5 hours. This airing consists of a one-hour program anchored by Bruneau, followed by half-hour local programs anchored by a local journalist at each TVA station. The local anchors are Pierre Donais on CHOT-DT in Gatineau/Ottawa, Martin Blanchet on CFER-DT in Rimouski, Cindy Simard on CIMT-DT in Rivière-du-Loup and CHAU-DT in Carleton-sur-Mer, Katherine Vandal on CFEM-DT in Rouyn-Noranda, Jean-François Tremblay on CJPM-DT in Saguenay, Sonia Lavoie on CHLT-DT in Sherbrooke and Marie-Claude Paradis-Desfossés on CHEM-DT in Trois-Rivières. Bruneau continues as anchor of the final half-hour on CFTM-DT in Montreal, and Jobin anchors on CFCM-DT in Quebec City; at 6:30, Bruneau continues to anchor for a further half-hour which airs only on LCN. 

On weekends, the 5 p.m. program does not air, with only a half-hour edition airing at 6 p.m. and anchored by Michel Jean.

Primetime
The main national edition of TVA Nouvelles, airing at 10 p.m. for half an hour, is anchored by Sophie Thibault weekdays and Cindy Royer on weekends.

The weekend edition may be delayed to 10:30 or 11 p.m. depending on network scheduling.

JE
The news magazine program JE is anchored by Marie-Christine Bergeron.

References

External links
TVA Nouvelles

1980s Canadian television news shows
1990s Canadian television news shows
2000s Canadian television news shows
2010s Canadian television news shows
2020s Canadian television news shows
TVA (Canadian TV network) original programming
Television shows filmed in Montreal
Television shows filmed in Quebec City